James Metcalfe Campbell Bower (born 22 November 1988) is an English actor and singer. He made his feature film debut in 2007 with a supporting role in Sweeney Todd: The Demon Barber of Fleet Street. He went on to  feature in The Twilight Saga, The Mortal Instruments: City of Bones, and as the young Gellert Grindelwald in Harry Potter and the Deathly Hallows – Part 1 and Fantastic Beasts: The Crimes of Grindelwald.

In the 2010s, Bower was part of the main casts of the fantasy series Camelot on Starz and Will on TNT. In 2022, Bower received critical acclaim for his performance as Henry Creel/One/Vecna in the fourth series of Stranger Things. From 2015 to 2020, he was the frontman of the London-based band Counterfeit. He has also released music as a solo artist.

Early life
Bower was born in London. His mother is a music manager and his father works for the Gibson Guitar Corporation. His maternal great-great-great-great-grandfather was Sir John Campbell, of Airds, Lieutenant Governor of Saint Vincent and the Grenadines.

Bower has had an interest in music and performance from a young age. He started playing the violin as a child, and was taught using the Suzuki method. He attended Bedales School, a co-educational independent school in Hampshire, and is a former member of the National Youth Music Theatre and the National Youth Theatre.

Career

Acting career 
Bower began his professional career when his friend Laura Michelle Kelly recommended him to her agent. He was a part-time model with Select Model Management in London. In 2008, he played Rocker in the film RocknRolla and Jack in Winter in Wartime. In 2009, he starred in the 2009 remake of the series The Prisoner as Number 11–12.

Also in 2009, he played the vampire Caius Volturi in the film The Twilight Saga: New Moon and both Twilight: Breaking Dawn films. He appeared as a young Gellert Grindelwald, the dark wizard defeated by Albus Dumbledore, in the 2010 film Harry Potter and the Deathly Hallows – Part 1; he reprised the same role in the 2018 film Fantastic Beasts: The Crimes of Grindelwald, becoming one of two actors to appear in both film franchises; the second Robert Pattinson, who appears as Cedric Diggory in the fourth Harry Potter movie, The Goblet of Fire, and Edward Cullen in the Twilight films. He played King Arthur in the 2011 television series Camelot. In 2010, he starred in the music video for "Young (Belane)" by The Xcerts.

In 2012, Bower appeared in the music video for "Never Let Me Go" by Florence + The Machine. He played Jace Wayland in The Mortal Instruments: City of Bones, the 2013 film adaption of The Mortal Instruments series, by Cassandra Clare. In December 2013, he joined the cast of Burberry's Campaign Stars for spring/summer 2014.

In June 2015, Bower began playing the role of Joe, in the West End musical Bend It Like Beckham. 

In July 2017, he was on the TNT original series Will (TV series). He played the role of the poet Christopher Marlowe.

In January 2019, Bower was announced to star in the prelude series to Game of Thrones, titled Bloodmoon (also known as The Long Night), but HBO announced it had decided to not pick the show up to series in October 2019. He starred in the 2020 film Six Days of Sistine, distributed by Mbur Indie Film Distributor and co-starring Elarica Johnson. Since 2015, Bower has voiced Skiff in the Thomas & Friends franchise, having contributed to the television show, two home videos, and the feature film Sodor's Legend of the Lost Treasure.

In 2022, Bower starred as Henry Creel / One / Vecna in season four of the Netflix series Stranger Things. The role required up to eight hours a day to apply the makeup for Vecna. His performance in the series garnered critical acclaim.

Music career 
Bower was the frontman and singer for the band Counterfeit, which released its first album in March 2017, and had a US tour in the same year. In November 2020, Bower announced the band's split through their Instagram page. He released music as a solo artist shortly after.

Personal life
In February 2010, Bower was confirmed to be dating actress Bonnie Wright, whom he had met on the set of Harry Potter and the Deathly Hallows – Part 1. In April 2011, they confirmed their engagement. On 30 June 2012, they amicably ended their engagement. From 2012 to 2018, he was in an on-off relationship with actress Lily Collins, and has reportedly been dating Jess Moloney since 2020.

In July 2022, he shared that he had been sober since March 2015. Bower has a mild form of dyslexia.

Discography

Singles

Filmography

Film

Television

Theatre

Music videos

Awards and nominations

References

External links

Living people
1988 births
21st-century English male actors
21st-century English male singers
21st-century English singers
English male film actors
English male models
English male singers
English male television actors
English people of Scottish descent
Male actors from London
National Youth Theatre members
People educated at Bedales School
People from Hammersmith
Select Model Management models
Singers from London
Actors with dyslexia
Musicians with dyslexia